The men's 100 metre breaststroke competition of the swimming events at the 1979 Pan American Games took place on 2 July at the Piscina Olimpica Del Escambron. The last Pan American Games champion was Rick Colella of the US.

This race consisted of two lengths of the pool, both lengths being in breaststroke.

Results
All times shown are in minutes and seconds.

Heats
The first round was held on July 2.

Final 
The final was held on July 2.

References

Swimming at the 1979 Pan American Games